Janet Harris is a former women's basketball player for the National Collegiate Athletic Association (NCAA). She is a member of the Women's Basketball Hall of Fame for the class of 2015.

High school
Harris helped lead her Marshall high school team from Chicago to a 31–2 record during her senior year. She was inducted into the Illinois High School Basketball Hall of Fame.

NCAA
Harris played four years at University of Georgia. The team advanced to the Final Four two of those years. During her final season, the Georgia Lady Bulldogs finished as NCAA runners-up.

Georgia statistics
Source

Accomplishments
She was the first women's basketball player in NCAA history to score 2,500 points and collect 1,250 rebounds
She has scored career totals of 2,641 points and 1,398 rebounds, number 34 and number 18 in NCAA women's basketball history, respectively.
Harris was inducted into the Women's Basketball Hall of Fame on June 13, 2015.

See also
 List of NCAA Division I women's basketball players with 2,500 points and 1,000 rebounds

References

Living people
All-American college women's basketball players
American women's basketball players
Basketball players from Chicago
Georgia Lady Bulldogs basketball players
Year of birth missing (living people)